The Judgement Book is a 1935 American Western film directed by Charles Hutchison and starring Conway Tearle, Bernadene Hayes and Howard Lang.

Cast
 Conway Tearle as Steve Harper  
 Bernadene Hayes as Madge Williams  
 Howard Lang as Bill Williams 
 Richard Cramer as Ross Rankin 
 William Gould as Hank Osborne  
 Steve Pendleton as Tim Osborne 
 Roy Rice as James Burke  
 Jimmy Aubrey as Ed Worden 
 Ray Gallagher as Duffy Miller  
 Philip Kieffer as  Tracy  
 Dick Rush as Sheriff Lee

References

Bibliography
 Pitts, Michael R. Poverty Row Studios, 1929–1940: An Illustrated History of 55 Independent Film Companies, with a Filmography for Each. McFarland & Company, 2005.

External links
 

1935 films
1935 Western (genre) films
American Western (genre) films
Films directed by Charles Hutchison
American black-and-white films
1930s English-language films
1930s American films